In Slavic languages, iotation is a form of palatalization that occurs when a consonant comes into contact with a palatal approximant  from the succeeding phoneme. The  is represented by iota (ι) in the Cyrillic alphabet and the Greek alphabet on which it is based. For example, ni in English onion has the sound of iotated n. Iotation is a phenomenon distinct  from Slavic first palatalization in which only the front vowels are involved, but the final result is similar.

Sound change
Iotation occurs when a labial, dental or velar consonant comes into contact with an iotified vowel, i.e. one preceded by a palatal glide . As a result, the consonant becomes partially or completely palatalized. In many Slavic languages, iotated consonants are called "soft" and the process of iotation is called "softening".

Iotation can result in a partial palatalization so the centre of the tongue is raised during and after the articulation of the consonant. There can also be a complete sound change to a palatal or alveolo-palatal consonant. This table summarizes the typical outcomes in the modern Slavic languages:

According to most scholars, the period of iotation started approximately in the 5th century, in the era of Proto-Slavic, and it lasted for several centuries, probably into the late Common Slavic dialect differentiation. Here are examples from the early stage:
 Proto-Slavic * > Russian, Ukrainian, Macedonian, Bulgarian , Czech , Serbo-Croatian

Orthography

Iotified vowels 
In Slavic languages, iotified vowels are preceded by a palatal approximant  before a vowel, at the beginning of a word, or between two vowels in the middle of a word, creating a diphthongoid, a partial diphthong. In the Greek alphabet, the consonant is represented by iota (ι). For example, the English apple is cognate to Russian яблоко (jabloko): both come from Proto-Indo-European stem *ābol-.

As it was invented for the writing of Slavic languages, the original Cyrillic alphabet has relatively complex ways for representing iotation by devoting an entire class of letters to deal with the issue. There are letters which represent iotified vowels; the same letters also palatalize preceding consonants (with or without self-iotation), which is why iotation and palatalization are often mixed up. The exact use depends on the language.

The adjective for a phone which undergoes iotation is iotated. The adjective for a letter formed as a ligature of the Early Cyrillic I (І) and another letter, used to represent iotation, is iotified.. The use of an iotified letter does not necessarily denote iotation. Even an iotified letter following a consonant letter is not iotated in most orthographies, but iotified letters imply iotated pronunciation after vowels, soft and hard signs as well as in isolation.

In the Cyrillic alphabet, some letter forms are iotified, formed as a ligature of Early Cyrillic I (І) and a vowel.

In old inscriptions, other iotified letters, even consonants, could be found, but they are not in the regular alphabet.

There are more letters that serve the same function, but their glyphs are not made in the same way.

Iotated consonants 
Iotated consonants occur as result of iotation.

When Vuk Karadžić reformed the Serbian language, he created new letters to represent iotated consonants. Macedonian uses two of them, but has its own versions for iotated t and d (resembling the letters Г and К instead of Т and Д):

See also 
 Cyrillic alphabet
 Cyrillic ligatures
 Iotacism
 Palatalization, the historical-linguistic sound change
 Soft sign

References

Bibliography

 
 

Assimilation (linguistics)
Cyrillic script